730 Naval Air Squadron (730 NAS) was a Naval Air Squadron of the Royal Navy's Fleet Air Arm. It was active between 1944 and 1945 as a communications squadron. The squadron was formed and operated out of RNAS Abbotsinch from April to November 1944, by that point in time it operated four types of aircraft. It moved to RNAS Ayr and while there gained two more aircraft types. For the first three months of 1945 a detachment operated out of RNAS Machrihanish, however, the squadron remained at RNAS Ayr until disbanding in August 1945.

History of 730 NAS

Communications Squadron (1944 - 1945)

730 Naval Air Squadron was formed on the 17 April 1944 at RNAS Abbotsinch (HMS Sanderling) located in Paisley, Renfrewshire, in Scotland, where the squadron operated Stinson Reliant, a single-engine four- to five-seat high-wing monoplane aircraft and Beech Expediter II, a twin-engined, low-wing, tailwheel light aircraft.

Later that year, in August, Beech Traveller aircraft were acquired, an American biplane with an atypical negative wing stagger and these were soon followed by Fairey Firefly, a carrier-borne fighter aircraft and anti-submarine aircraft, in the September. The squadron remained stationed at RNAS Abbotsinch for around seven months before moving to RNAS Ayr (HMS Wagtail) situated in Prestwick, South Ayrshire, in Scotland, on the 20 November 1944. From January 1945, Oxford, a twin-engine monoplane aircraft and Swordfish, a biplane torpedo bomber aircraft, were added and these were in use until the squadron was dissolved.

From the 1 January to the 8 March 1945, a detachment from 730 NAS, out of RNAS Ayr, operated from RNAS Machrihanish (HMS Landrail), located close to Campbeltown in Argyll and Bute, Scotland.

On the 1 August 1945, 730 NAS disbanded at RNAS Ayr.

Aircraft flown

The squadron has flown a number of different aircraft types, including:
Stinson Reliant (Apr 1944-Aug 1945)
Beech Expediter II (Apr 1944-Aug 1945)
Supermarine Walrus (1944)
Beech Traveller Mk. I (Aug 1944-Aug 1945)
Fairey Firefly F.I (Sep 1944-Aug 1945)
Airspeed Oxford (Jan 1945-Aug 1945)
Fairey Swordfish I (Jan 1945-Aug 1945)

Naval Air Stations  

730 Naval Air Squadron operated from two naval air stations of the Royal Navy, both in Scotland:
Royal Naval Air Station ABBOTSINCH (17 April 1944 - 20 November 1944)
Royal Naval Air Station AYR (20 November 1944 - 1 August 1945)

Commanding Officers 

List of commanding officers of 730 Naval Air Squadron with month and year of appointment and end:

 Lt G. Windsor, RNVR (Apr 1944 - Dec 1944)
 Lt C. White, RNVR (Dec 1944 - May 1945)
 Lt J. C. Kennedy, RN (May 1945 - Aug 1945)

References

Citations

Bibliography

700 series Fleet Air Arm squadrons
Military units and formations established in 1944
Military units and formations of the Royal Navy in World War II